The 1986 Cleveland Browns season was the team’s 37th season with the National Football League. The death of Don Rogers, a promising young defensive back who was preparing to enter his third season in the NFL, cast a black cloud over the team as it prepared for the 1986 season.

Cleveland won their first postseason game since 1969, and for the first time in franchise history, the Browns reached the AFC Championship Game, where they would eventually fall to the Denver Broncos, in the game famous for “The Drive.” It would be the first of three AFC Championship games that the Browns would reach in four seasons, all losses to Denver.

Season Summary
The 1986 Browns finished 12–4 to not only win the division again, but also set a franchise record for regular-season victories in the NFL in addition to securing home-field advantage throughout the AFC playoffs.

In one of the most pulsating games in club history, the Browns edged the New York Jets 23–20 in double-overtime in the divisional playoffs. Then, in maybe the most disappointing contest in team annals, the Browns lost to the Denver Broncos by that same score in OT in the AFC Championship Game as quarterback John Elway orchestrated what has become known as The Drive. The Browns were involved in six contests decided by three points or less, and eight decided by six points or less. There were two OT games – in consecutive weeks, no less – when the Browns beat the Pittsburgh Steelers 37–31 and the Houston Oilers 13–10, both in Cleveland. That win started the Browns on a five-game winning streak to end the season, and it was also part of a stretch in which they won eight of nine contests.

There were several other big games in addition to the two OT affairs. The Browns beat the Steelers at Three Rivers Stadium for the first time in 16 tries, 27–24. They defeated Miami 26–16 on Monday Night Football, extracting some revenge for their loss to the Dolphins in the divisional playoffs the year before. They wound up clinching the AFC Central crown by going to Cincinnati in the next-to-last game and winning soundly, 34–3. The Bengals finished in second place at 10–6 but did not make the playoffs.

Kosar's career really took off in 1986, as he threw for 3,854 yards and seventeen touchdowns with just ten interceptions for an 83.8 quarterback rating. Wide receiver Brian Brennan, who led the way with 55 receptions and six scores, was one of seven Browns to catch 28 or more passes. The backfield combo of FB Kevin Mack and HB Earnest Byner battled injuries for much of the year. That, along with the increased emphasis on passing, caused the rushing numbers to go way down. As a team, the Browns got just 1,650 yards, with Mack rushing for a team-leading 665. He did, however, run for ten scores.

Hanford Dixon and Frank Minnifield were among the top cornerbacks in the league, leading a defense that excelled down the stretch, limiting the last four opponents to 17 or fewer points.

Offseason

NFL Draft

Personnel

Staff

Roster

Regular season
Cleveland opened the regular season on the road against the defending Super Bowl champion Chicago Bears.  While the Browns played well in scoring 31 points against the feared Chicago defense, they surrendered a season-high 41 points in a losing effort. The team responded well and won four of the next five games, including wins against divisional rivals Houston and Pittsburgh. The win against Pittsburgh snapped a losing streak for the Browns of sixteen games at Three Rivers Stadium.

After a week seven loss at home against the Green Bay Packers, the Browns won eight of their last nine regular season games to capture the AFC Central division title and finish the year with a franchise-record 12 wins (against 4 losses).

Schedule

Note: Intra-division opponents are in bold text.

Season summary

Week 8 at Vikings

Week 15

Standings

Best Performances
 Bernie Kosar, November 10, 1986, 401 passing yards vs. Miami Dolphins
 Bernie Kosar, November 23, 1986, 414 passing yards vs. Pittsburgh Steelers

Postseason

The first round opponent for the Browns in the playoffs was the New York Jets.  In a marathon game that lasted over four hours, the Browns won their first playoff game in 18 years, 23–20, on a 27-yard Mark Moseley field goal in double overtime.

Eight days later, the Browns hosted the Denver Broncos to determine the AFC Championship and a trip to Pasadena, California to face the New York Giants in the Super Bowl. In a repeat of the Browns' playoff game from the previous week, the game was, once again, undecided at the end of regulation with both teams having scored 20 points. Even though the Browns had star defensive players like Hanford Dixon and Frank Minnifield, the Broncos offense would not give up. The Broncos forced overtime on a 98-yard possession at the end of the fourth quarter that culminated in a game-tying touchdown and later became known simply as "The Drive". The Browns received the ball to begin the overtime period, but were forced to punt after running only three plays. The Broncos then took possession and ultimately scored the game winning points on a 33-yard field goal by Rich Karlis to send Denver to the Super Bowl.

AFC Divisional Playoffs

AFC Championship Game

This game is best remembered for "The Drive", during which when the Broncos drove 98 yards to tie the game with 37 seconds left in regulation, and Denver kicker Rich Karlis made the game-winning 33-yard field goal 5:38 into overtime.

References

External links 
 1986 Cleveland Browns at Pro Football Reference (Profootballreference.com)
 1986 Cleveland Browns Statistics at jt-sw.com
 1986 Cleveland Browns Schedule at jt-sw.com
 1986 Cleveland Browns at DatabaseFootball.com  

Cleveland
Cleveland Browns seasons
AFC Central championship seasons
Cleveland